Arundel High School is a public high school located in Gambrills, Maryland, a suburb of Washington, D.C., and Baltimore within Anne Arundel County.

The school is part of the Anne Arundel County Public School system, and is the primary high school for Gambrills and portions of the Odenton area. Originally, the school was the Anne Arundel Academy, a prestigious one-room private school founded in 1854. That institution became Arundel High School in 1926. It is one of the oldest public high schools in the country, and the oldest mainstream public school in the state of Maryland. The current school building was built in 1949 and first occupied in 1950, with additions/renovations in 1966, 1986, 1987, 2006, and 2008.

Students

Attendance
Arundel High School's September enrollments, 2004 – present:

Arundel High School only has one feeder middle school, Arundel Middle School. Arundel Middle School has 4 feeder elementary schools: Piney Orchard, Waugh Chapel, Odenton, and Four Seasons. Prior to the opening of Crofton High School, Crofton Middle School was also included in the Arundel High School feeder system. In the Fall of 2020, Arundel High School students from the Crofton area who were in grade 9 during the 2019–2020 school year were relocated to Crofton High School. However, because Crofton High only served students in grades 9 and 10 during the 2020–2021 school year and will only serve grades 9, 10, and 11 during the 2021–2022 school year, Arundel High students from the Crofton area who were in grades 11 and 12 in the fall of 2020 remained at Arundel High School.

The student body is 55% White, 24% Black, 8.0% Hispanic and Latino, 6% Asian, and 7% of students identify as being of two or more races. 13% of students receive free and reduced–price meals as of 2020.

Academics and rankings

Rankings

Arundel High School has place highly on a number of rankings:

 In 2013, Newsweek ranked Arundel High School as the 2nd best high school in Anne Arundel County and one of the top 20 high schools in Maryland. Arundel was placed in the top 5% of public high schools in the United States.
 In 2012 and 2013, Arundel High School was ranked as one of the DC area's most challenging high schools by the Washington Post. Arundel ranked in the top 5% of the most challenging high schools in the country. The criteria for the ratings measured college readiness by comparing AP participation rates at different high schools.
 In 2015, Arundel High School was among the top 15 high schools in Maryland and top 1,000 in the country (out of 26,000 public high schools) by U.S. News & World Report and in 2015 was ranked as the 2nd best among high schools in Anne Arundel County.
 In the latest 2019 ratings, Arundel High School received a 4-star rating by the Maryland State Department of Education, which began assigning schools a star rating out of 5 in 2018. Arundel High School, Arundel Middle School, and the four elementary feeder schools (collectively referred to as the “Arundel cluster”) had the third best scores of any cluster in Anne Arundel County. Arundel Middle and Odenton Elementary also received 4-star ratings, while Piney Orchard, Four Seasons, and Waugh Chapel Elementary Schools received 5/5 star ratings. The Severna Park cluster ranked as the best in the county and the Broadneck cluster ranked as the 2nd best in the county.
 As of 2021, Arundel High School was ranked in the top 15% of public high schools in the United States by U.S. News & World Report.
 As of 2021, Arundel High School has the second highest equity rating of all non-charter public high schools in Anne Arundel County on GreatSchools, with the first highest being Severna Park High. The equity section measures the academic performance of underserved students relative to the state average in a given school, as well as how well schools are closing the academic achievement gap.

Notable former students
Stephen Bainbridge (1980), Professor of Law at UCLA Law School, legal scholar, blogger
Kyle Beckerman (2000), Major League Soccer midfielder
Elizabeth Ann Bennett, film and television actress
Jill E. Brown, first female African American pilot for a major American passenger airline
Louis Carter (1971), NFL player
Crystal Chappell (1981), actress on Guiding Light and Days of Our Lives; creator, producer, writer and actor; Venice: The Series
Steven Thomas Fischer (1990), two-time Emmy Award nominated filmmaker and cartoonist
R.J. Harris (2010), Canadian Football League wide receiver
Dave Johnson (1982), play-by-play announcer for the Washington Wizards on 106.7 the fan and DC United on CSN Mid Atlantic
Chris Kubasik (1979), former President and Chief Operating Officer of Lockheed Martin Corporation
Alec Lemon (2009), wide receiver in the NFL for the Houston Texans 
Darnerien McCants (1996), National Football League wide receiver
Mark McEwen (1972), TV personality
Denny Neagle (1986), Major League Baseball pitcher
Edward Snowden, NSA whistleblower, dropped out midway through the 1998-99 school year
Wanda Sykes (1982), comedian

Athletics
Arundel High School competes in the Anne Arundel County Division of Maryland's 4A subdivision

Arundel High has won 33 State Championships dating back to 1908 in various sports:

 Baseball - 1976, 1977, 1981, 1987, 1991, 1993, 1995, 1998, 2001, 2006
 Boys Basketball - 1964
 Boys Lacrosse - 1980, 1981, 1995
 Boys Soccer - 1987
 Boys Track and Field - 1970, 1971
 Fall Cheerleading - 2016
 Football - 1975
 Girls Basketball - 1996, 2000, 2004, 2010
 Golf -1991, 1992
 Softball - 1983
 Unified Bocce - 2012, 2017
 Wrestling - 1985,1998
 Wrestling Duals - 1997
 Volleyball - 1953,

References

External links
Arundel High School website
Arundel Athletics Website

Educational institutions established in 1854
Public high schools in Maryland
Schools in Anne Arundel County, Maryland
1854 establishments in Maryland